Donald Gordon Hansey (August 21, 1929 – April 3, 2015) was an American politician in the state of Washington. He served the 42nd district from 1971 to 1973 and the 40th district from 1973 to 1977.

References

1929 births
2015 deaths
Politicians from Everett, Washington
Republican Party members of the Washington House of Representatives